Attulus penicilloides is a jumping spider species that lives in North Korea. The female was first described by Wanda Wesołowska in 1993 and named Sitticus penicilloides in the genus Sitticus but was moved to the genus Attulus in 2017.

References

Spiders described in 1981
Fauna of Korea
Sitticini
Spiders of Asia
Taxa named by Wanda Wesołowska